Geoffrey Martin may refer to:

Sportspeople
 Geoffrey Martin (footballer) (1927–2020), Australian rules footballer
 Geoffrey Martin (cricketer) (1896–1968), Australian cricketer
 Geoff Martin (English footballer) (1940–2021), English footballer
 Geoff Martin (Australian footballer) (born 1958), Australian rules footballer

Others
 Geoffrey K. Martin, American mathematical physicist
 Geoffrey Martin (historian) (1928–2007), British historian and Keeper of Public Records
 Geoffrey Thorndike Martin (1934–2022), Egyptologist

See also
 Jeff Martin (disambiguation)